•	The International Teen Princess was a contest that began in 1966 in Chicago, Illinois, where it was held for four years. In 1970 its name was changed to World Teen Princess and held three times in European locations. In 1973 it was changed to two contest; one Teen Princess that was continued for two times and apparently was discontinued after the 1974 pageant in Venezuela. other Miss Teenage Peace International in Oranjestad, Aruba that in 1974 its name was changed to " Miss Teenage Intercontinental".

Winners 
  1966: Japan  - Reiko Oshida
  1967: Finland  - Kristiina Kankaanpää
  1968: Iran  - Elaheh Azodi
  1969: Israel  - Sharona Marash
  1970: Norway  - Elisabeth Krogh
  1971: Venezuela  - Maria Conchita Alonso Bustillo
  1972: United States  - Kathy St. Johns
  1973: Germany  - Ute Kittelberger
  1974: India  - Radha Bartake

Beauty pageants for youth
International beauty pageants